Mike Paxman (born 19 December 1953) is an English multi-instrumentalist and record producer, best known for his work with Judie Tzuke, Nick Kamen, Uriah Heep and Status Quo and Asia.

Paxman grew up in Wiltshire, England and went to Bishop Wordsworth's School in Salisbury. During the late 1970s, he played drums in the Salisbury-based contemporary jazz quartet Sphere, along with saxophonist Andy Sheppard, pianist Geoff Williams, and double bassist Peter Maxfield (all ex-B.W.S.).

He played guitar, in the studio and on tour, and wrote with singer-songwriter Judie Tzuke from the late 1970s. He co-wrote Tzuke's single "Stay with Me till Dawn" and her first album Welcome to the Cruise, then went on to write and produce a further twelve albums with her. Paxman continued working in the studio with Tzuke through to the late 1990s.

From the mid-1980s, Paxman mainly focused on production work, founding Big Ocean Studios with Paul Muggleton, Tzuke's partner. They went on to work with various artists, including Nick Kamen (including the hit single "I Promised Myself"), Paul Norton (Under a Southern Sky), Scarlet (the album Naked and single "Independent Love Song"), Thomas Anders (the album Whispers), Frances Ruffelle and Jimmy Nail.

Paxman has also worked with Status Quo extensively, producing several albums and DVDs including Under The Influence (1999), Heavy Traffic (2002), The Party Ain't Over Yet... (2005), Quid Pro Quo (2011),  Aquostic (2014) and Aquostic II (2016). He produced and mixed the Status Quo Frantic Four live reunion DVDs in 2013 and 2014.

Paxman produced Quo's John "Rhino" Edwards' solo albums Rhino's Revenge, released in 2000, and Rhino's Revenge II, released in 2015.

He produced Quo keyboard player Andy Bown's solo album: Unfinished Business, released in September 2011.

Paxman has produced four studio albums with Uriah Heep: Wake the Sleeper (2008), Celebration – Forty Years of Rock (2009), Into the Wild (2011) and Outsider (2014). He also produced a number of live albums and DVDs for the band.

He produced Omega from Asia with original members John Wetton, Steve Howe, Carl Palmer and Geoff Downes in 2010, and produced Asia's 30th anniversary studio album XXX, which was released in mid 2012. XXX was the final Asia album in their history after the departure of Steve Howe and later 2017 death of founder and singer, John Wetton.

References

External links
Uriah Heep biography
Judie Tzuke albums
Status Quo albums
Mike Paxman at AllMusic
Asia

1953 births
Living people
English record producers
English rock guitarists
English male guitarists
English multi-instrumentalists
English songwriters
Place of birth missing (living people)
People from Wiltshire
People educated at Bishop Wordsworth's School
British male songwriters